Laraib Khan (daughter of Attaullah Khan) is professional VFX artist hails from Isakhel, Mianwali, Punjab, Pakistan. She worked as a visual effects artist for a myriad of Hollywood films including 10,000 BC, The Chronicles of Narnia, Prince of Persia, Godzilla and X-Men: Days of Future Past. She also worked for BBC, Glassworks Barcelona and MPC.

Notable Work

Awards

VES Award

References

External links
 

Visual effects artists
Special effects people
Living people
American artists of Pakistani descent
Year of birth missing (living people)